Valencia is a historic plantation house located near Ridgeway, Fairfield County, South Carolina.  It was built in 1834, and is a large two-story frame house on a brick pier foundation. The house features a hipped roof, two mammoth chimneys, and a broad one-story piazza with unique elliptical arches. Valencia was built by Edward Gendron Palmer, a leader in civic, political, and religious life of Ridgeway and Fairfield County.

It was added to the National Register of Historic Places in 1971.

References

Plantation houses in South Carolina
Houses on the National Register of Historic Places in South Carolina
Houses completed in 1834
Houses in Fairfield County, South Carolina
National Register of Historic Places in Fairfield County, South Carolina